State Route 197 (SR 197) is  east–west state highway in the western part of the U.S. state of Ohio. The western terminus of SR 197 is at a signalized intersection in downtown Celina that marks the junction of U.S. Route 127 (US 127), SR 29 and SR 703.

Route description

There are no segments of SR 197 that are included as a part of the National Highway System (NHS).  The NHS is a network of highways that are identified as being most important for the economy, mobility and defense of the nation.

The western terminus of SR 197 is at a traffic light between U.S. Route 127 (US 127), SR 29 and SR 703.  SR 197 heads north concurrent with US 127, until SR 197 turns to the northeast.  The route leaves Celina passing through rural Mercer County.  In rural Mercer County the road has an intersection with US 33.  The highway heads northeast from US 33 towards SR 66.  The road has an intersection with SR 66 and afterwards turns towards southeast.  The eastern terminus of the highway is that an intersection with SR 198.

History
The SR 197 designation was applied in 1923.  It was originally routed along much of its present alignment, from its western terminus in downtown Celina to its junction with SR 66 south of Spencerville.  SR 197 was extended to the east in 1937, routed along previously county-maintained roadways to its current eastern terminus at SR 198.

Major intersections

References

197
Transportation in Auglaize County, Ohio
Transportation in Mercer County, Ohio